This was the first edition of the Seoul Open.

Jim Grabb won the tournament, beating Andre Agassi in the final, 1–6, 6–4, 6–2.

Seeds

  Ramesh Krishnan (first round)
  Jim Grabb (champion)
  Jaime Yzaga (second round)
  Richard Matuszewski (first round)
  Jean-Philippe Fleurian (semifinals)
  Ben Testerman (semifinals)
  Michiel Schapers (quarterfinals)
  Andre Agassi (final)

Draw

Finals

Top half

Bottom half

References

External links
 Main draw

Seoul Open
1987 Grand Prix (tennis)
1987 Seoul Open